King Street is a hamlet in the High Ongar civil parish of the Epping Forest district of Essex, England.

References 
 A-Z Essex (page 69)

External links

Hamlets in Essex 
Epping Forest District